The 2004 Vale of Glamorgan Council election took place on Thursday 10 June 2004 to elect members of Vale of Glamorgan Council in Wales. This was the same day as many other local elections in Wales and England. The Conservatives remained the largest party but did not have a majority. The previous full council election was in 1999 and the next full council election was in May 2008.

Overview
Council elections in Wales were originally scheduled for May 2003, but were delayed by a year to avoid a conflict with the 2003 Wales Assembly elections.

Forty-seven seats were up for election in the Vale of Glamorgan. There was an increase in electoral divisions from 22 to 23 following The County Borough of The Vale of Glamorgan (Electoral Changes) Order 2002, which had divided the Alexandra ward into two new wards (and increased the representation in Sully to two councillors). The overall turnout (including spoilt ballots) was 44.4%.

Election result
The Conservative Party remained the largest party following the election, though did not have a majority.

|}

Ward results

References

Vale of Glam
Vale of Glamorgan Council elections